, provisional designation , is a Mars-crossing asteroid and a binary candidate from inside the innermost region of the asteroid belt, approximately  in diameter. It was discovered on 24 August 1987, by American astronomer Stephen Singer-Brewster at the Palomar Observatory in California. The likely spherical X-type asteroid has a rotation period of 3.1 hours. The suspected presence of a kilometer-sized minor-planet moon was announced in November 2000.

Orbit and classification 

 is a Mars-crossing asteroid, a member of the dynamically unstable group, located between the main belt and near-Earth populations, and crossing the orbit of Mars at 1.666 AU. It orbits the Sun inside the innermost region of the asteroid belt at a distance 1.5–2.9 AU once every 3 years and 3 months (1,199 days; semi-major axis of 2.21 AU). Its orbit has an eccentricity of 0.31 and an inclination of 27° with respect to the ecliptic.

The body's observation arc begins with a precovery published by the Digitized Sky Survey and taken at Palomar in May 1954, more than 33 years prior to its official discovery observation. It will pass  from the main-belt asteroid 7 Iris on 3 September 2173.

Numbering and naming 

This minor planet was numbered by the Minor Planet Center on 26 July 2000. As of 2018, it has not been named.

Physical characteristics 

In the SDSS-based taxonomy and according to the survey conducted by Pan-STARRS,  is an X-type asteroid. It has also been classified as a common, stony S-type asteroid.

Rotation period 

Lightcurve analysis gave a rotation period of 3.068 hours and a brightness variation of 0.07 magnitude. Within less than two weeks, follow-up observations by a large international collaboration of astronomers determined a refined period of  hours with a low amplitude of 0.07 magnitude, indicating that the body has a spherical shape. An alternative observation that gave a tentative period 9.709 hours received a poor quality rating.

Strong binary candidate 

The findings were announced on 6 November 2009. The lightcurve indicated mutual occultation events, however, a conclusive solution for the orbit period was not obtained. The Johnston's archive estimates a diameter of 1.23 kilometer for the satellite, or 31% the size of its primary.

The international collaboration included Richard Durkee at the Shed of Science Observatory , Petr Pravec, Kamil Hornoch and Peter Kušnirák at Ondřejov Observatory, Donald Pray at Carbuncle Hill Observatory , David Higgins at Canberra , Jozef Világi and Štefan Gajdoš at Modra Observatory, Judit Györgyey Ries at McDonald Observatory and Julian Oey at Leura Observatory , as well as astronomers at the Kharkiv Kharkov , Simeiz and Skalnate Pleso observatories.

Diameter and albedo 

According to the survey carried out by the NEOWISE mission of NASA's Wide-field Infrared Survey Explorer,  measures 2.95 kilometers in diameter and its surface has an albedo of 0.268, while the Collaborative Asteroid Lightcurve Link assumes a standard albedo for a stony asteroid of 0.20 and derives a diameter of 3.04 kilometers based on an absolute magnitude of 14.99.

Notes

References

External links 
 CBET 2540 – (15700) 1987 QD Central Bureau for Astronomical Telegrams, 6 Nov 2010
 Asteroids with Satellites, Robert Johnston, johnstonsarchive.net
 Asteroid Lightcurve Database (LCDB), query form (info )
 Discovery Circumstances: Numbered Minor Planets (15001)-(20000) – Minor Planet Center
 
 

015700
Discoveries by Stephen Singer-Brewster
015700
19870824